The Khampepe Commission was a judicial commission of enquiry headed by Judge Sisi Khampepe that was established to investigate the Scorpions and recommend on whether they should be merged into the South African Police Service.

Law enforcement in South Africa
Public inquiries in South Africa